Acrista  is a genus of sea snails, marine gastropod mollusks in the family Clathurellidae.

The Australian Faunal Directory considers this genus a synonym of Lienardia (Acrista) Hedley, 1922

Species

References

 Hedley, 1922; Records of the Australian Museum, 13(6): 285.
  Bouchet, P.; Kantor, Y. I.; Sysoev, A.; Puillandre, N. (2011). A new operational classification of the Conoidea. Journal of Molluscan Studies. 77, 273-308

External links
  Bouchet, P.; Kantor, Y. I.; Sysoev, A.; Puillandre, N. (2011). A new operational classification of the Conoidea. Journal of Molluscan Studies. 77, 273-308

Clathurellidae